James City Historic District is a national historic district located near Madison, Madison County, Virginia. The district encompasses 14 contributing buildings in the rural hamlet of James City.  They consist of late-18th-, early-to-late 19th-, and early-20th century commercial, residential, and agricultural buildings. The commercial buildings include two stores, a tavern and a blacksmith shop.

It was listed on the National Register of Historic Places in 2001.

References

External links

 Tavern-Store-Kitchen, Route 29 & Route 631, Madison, Madison County, VA at the Historic American Buildings Survey (HABS)
 Feed Store-School, Route 29 & Route 631, Madison, Madison County, VA at HABS

Buildings and structures in Madison County, Virginia
Historic districts in Northern Virginia
Historic districts on the National Register of Historic Places in Virginia
National Register of Historic Places in Madison County, Virginia
Historic American Buildings Survey in Virginia